Sarah Munro (born 1996) is a British singer-songwriter.

Sarah Munro may also refer to:

Sarah Munro (artist) (born 1970), New Zealand artist
Sarah Munro (judge), British crown court judge

See also
 Sarah Munroe Three-Decker, historic triple decker house in Worcester, Massachusetts